The 2023 Copa Sudamericana first stage was played from 7 to 9 March 2023. A total of 32 teams competed in the first stage to decide 16 of the 32 places in the group stage of the 2023 Copa Sudamericana.

Draw

The draw for the first stage was held on 21 December 2022, 12:00 PYST (UTC−3), at the CONMEBOL Convention Centre in Luque, Paraguay. For the first stage, the 32 teams involved were divided into eight pots according to their national association.

The 32 teams were drawn into 16 ties, with the four teams from each national association being drawn against a rival from the same association in two ties per association.

Format

In the first stage, each tie was played as a single-leg match. If tied after 90 minutes, extra time would not be played, and a penalty shoot-out would be used to determine the winner (Regulations Article 2.4.2).

The 16 winners of the first stage advanced to the group stage to join the 12 teams directly qualified for that stage (six from Argentina and six from Brazil), and four teams transferred from the Copa Libertadores (the four teams eliminated in the third stage of qualifying).

Matches
Matches in this round were played on 7–9 March 2023.

|}

Match BOL 1

Oriente Petrolero advanced to the group stage (BOL 1).

Match BOL 2

Blooming advanced to the group stage (BOL 2).

Match CHI 1

Palestino advanced to the group stage (CHI 1).

Match CHI 2

Audax Italiano advanced to the group stage (CHI 2).

Match COL 1

Deportes Tolima advanced to the group stage (COL 1).

Match COL 2

Santa Fe advanced to the group stage (COL 2).

Match ECU 1

LDU Quito advanced to the group stage (ECU 1).

Match ECU 2

Emelec advanced to the group stage (ECU 2).

Match PAR 1

Guaraní advanced to the group stage (PAR 1).

Match PAR 2

Tacuary advanced to the group stage (PAR 2).

Match PER 1

Universidad César Vallejo advanced to the group stage (PER 1).

Match PER 2

Universitario advanced to the group stage (PER 2).

Match URU 1

Danubio advanced to the group stage (URU 1).

Match URU 2

Peñarol advanced to the group stage (URU 2).

Match VEN 1

Academia Puerto Cabello advanced to the group stage (VEN 1).

Match VEN 2

Estudiantes de Mérida advanced to the group stage (VEN 2).

Notes

References

1
March 2023 sports events in South America